

This is a list of personal names known in English that are modified from another language and are or were not used among the person themselves.

It does not include:
 aliases, pseudonyms, and stage names (such as the librettist Metastasio)
 latinized spellings of other languages and other spelling variants (such as removal/spelling out of diacritics, e.g. Arnold Schoenberg, born Arnold Schönberg, US citizen in 1941))
permanent name changes, colloquially known as "Ellis Island Specials" (such as George Frideric Handel born Georg Friedrich Händel, naturalised British subject in 1727; Sumner Redstone, legally translated his originally German/Yiddish surname Rothstein along with the rest of his family in 1940)

This list also includes names from non-English languages the individual did not use, such as Latin or French.

Modern convention is not to translate modern personal names.

Translated names currently used

See also 

 List of Latinised names

References

Exonyms